Cowanesque Valley Junior Senior High School is a diminutive, rural public high school. It is located at 51 North Fork Road, Westfield, in the western region of Tioga County,  in Pennsylvania, USA.  It is one of two public high schools operated by Northern Tioga School District. In 2015, Cowanesque Valley Junior Senior High School's enrollment was reported as 390 pupils in 7th through 12th gradesCowanesque Valley Junior Senior High School employed 35 teachers in 2013. Per the Pennsylvania Department of Education, 100% of the teachers were rated "Highly Qualified" under the federal No Child Left Behind Act.

The BLaST Intermediate Unit IU17 provides the Cowanesque Valley Junior Senior High School with a wide variety of services like specialized education for disabled students and hearing, background checks for employees, state mandated recognizing and reporting child abuse training, speech and visual disability services and professional development for staff and faculty.

Extracurriculars
The Northern Tioga School District offers an extensive program of after school clubs, arts programs and an interscholastic athletics program.

Sports
Cowanesque Valley Junior Senior High School sports

Boys
 Baseball - A
 Basketball - A
 Cross Country - AA
 Football - A
 Golf - AA
 Tennis - AA
 Track and Field - AA

Girls
 Basketball - A
 Cross Country - AA
 Golf - AA
 Softball - A
 Girls' Tennis - AA
 Track and Field
 Volleyball - A

Junior High School Sports

Boys
 Basketball
 Cross Country
 Football
 Track and Field

Girls
 Basketball
 Cross Country
 Track and Field
 Volleyball

According to PIAA directory July 2015

References

Public high schools in Pennsylvania
Schools in Tioga County, Pennsylvania